The 2022–23 UNLV Lady Rebels basketball team represented the University of Nevada, Las Vegas during the 2022–23 NCAA Division I women's basketball season. The Lady Rebels are led by third-year head coach Lindy La Rocque. They played their home games at the Cox Pavilion, attached to the Thomas & Mack Center on UNLV's main campus in Paradise, Nevada. They are a member of the Mountain West Conference.

Roster

Schedule

|-
!colspan=9 style=| Exhibition

|-
!colspan=9 style=| Non-conference regular season

|-
!colspan=9 style=| Mountain West regular season

|-
!colspan=9 style=| Mountain West tournament

|-
!colspan=9 style=| NCAA Women's Tournament

Rankings

*The preseason and week 1 polls were the same.^Coaches did not release a week 2 poll.

See also
 2022–23 UNLV Runnin' Rebels basketball team

References 

UNLV
UNLV Lady Rebels basketball seasons
Rebels
Rebels
UNLV